is a Japanese manga series by Kana Mafune, who works for BS TV Tokyo. It was serialized in 2017 and collected in a single tankōbon volume by Asahi Shimbun Publishing in October of the same year. A sequel manga by Mafune titled  was serialized online via Asahi Shimbun Publishing's Sonorama Plus website between January 2019 and 2020 and also collected in a single tankōbon volume in March 2020. An anime television series adaptation by Jinnan Studio and Space Neko Company aired from January to March 2022.

Characters

Media

Manga

Anime
On November 2, 2021, an anime television series adaptation was announced.  The series is animated by Jinnan Studio and Space Neko Company, with Jun Aoki directing and writing the series, and Junpei Yamada composing the series' music at Warlock with cooperation by TV Tokyo Music, and Yuusuke Inada in charge of sound effects.  It aired from January 10 to March 28, 2022, on BS TV Tokyo, TV Tokyo, and AT-X.  Izuki Minato performed the series' ending theme song "Work out!".

Episode list

Notes

References

External links
  
 
 

2017 manga
2022 anime television series debuts
Anime series based on manga
Asahi Shimbun Company
Autobiographical anime and manga
Japanese webcomics
Television stations in fiction
TV Tokyo original programming
Webcomics in print